Catia Chien is a children's book illustrator from Sao Paulo, Brazil. She is currently working in New York City. She graduated from the Art Center College of Design in Pasadena, California in 2004.

She has produced work for several publishing companies, including Random House, Penguin Books and Candlewick Press. She has won a gold medal from the Society of Illustrators in Los Angeles for her work in Sea Serpent and Me, written by Dashka Slater. Chien has also received a Schneider Family Book Award for her ALA notable book, A Boy and a Jaguar, written by Alan Rabinowitz.

Chien also works in visual development for animation. She has worked on films such as The Little Prince and Wish Dragon.

Books 
 A Boy and a Jaguar, written by Alan Rabinowitz, HMH Books for Young Readers, 2014
 Things to Do, written by Elaine Magliaro, Chronicle Books, 2017
 My Blue is Happy, written by Jessica Young, Candlewick, 2013
 The Longest Night: A Passover Story, written by Laurel Snyder, Schwartz & Wade, 2013
 Princess Alyss of Wonderland, written by Frank Beddor, Dial, 2007
 The Sea Serpent and Me, written by Dashka Slater, HMH Books for Young Readers, 2008
 The Town of Turtle, written by Michelle Cuevas, HMH Books for Young Readers, 2018
 Flight, Volume One, written by Kazu Kibuishi, Image Comics and Ballantine Books, 2007

References

External links
Catia Chien "Brief But Spectacular" video from PBS

Year of birth missing (living people)
Living people
21st-century Brazilian women artists
21st-century Brazilian artists
Brazilian emigrants to the United States
Brazilian women illustrators
Art Center College of Design alumni